Microsomal prostaglandin E synthase-1 (mPGES-1) or Prostaglandin E synthase is an enzyme that in humans is encoded by the PTGES gene.

The protein encoded by this gene is a glutathione-dependent prostaglandin E synthase. The expression of this gene has been shown to be induced by proinflammatory cytokine interleukin 1 beta (IL1B). Its expression can also be induced by tumor suppressor protein TP53, and may be involved in TP53-induced apoptosis.

Knockout studies in mice suggest that this gene may contribute to the pathogenesis of collagen-induced arthritis and mediate acute pain during inflammatory responses.

See also
 Prostaglandin E synthase

References

Further reading